Mouni (ಮೌನಿ) is a Kannada language film released in 2003 directed by B. S. Lingadevaru, and is based on a novella of U. R. Ananthamurthy. It stars H. G. Dattatreya and Anant Nag in the lead roles.

Plot summary
Kuppanna Bhatta and Appanna Bhatta are areca cultivators and custodians of the math's property. The story revolves around the tensions and circumstances that shape and influence their relationship.

Cast
 H. G. Dattatreya
 Anant Nag
 Venkata Rao
 Nagendra Shah
 Rajeshwari Parthasarthy
 Achyuth Kumar
 Harish Raj
 Kari Subbu
 Lakshmi Chandrashekhar
 Vasudha Bharighat

Awards 
 2003 : National Film Award - Special Mention : H. G. Dattatreya
 2003 : Karnataka State Film Award for Best Story : U. R. Ananthamurthy

References

External links

2003 films
2000s Kannada-language films
Films directed by B. S. Lingadevaru